Solimonas is a genus of bacteria from the family of Nevskiaceae.

References

Further reading 
 
 

Gammaproteobacteria
Bacteria genera